Halobacteroides is a Gram-negative strictly anaerobic, chemoorganotrophic genus of bacteria from the family of Halobacteroidaceae.

See also
 List of bacterial orders
 List of bacteria genera

References

Clostridia
Bacteria genera
Taxa described in 1984